Chengyu are a type of traditional Chinese idiomatic expression, most of which consist of four characters.  Chengyu were widely used in Classical Chinese and are still common in vernacular Chinese writing and in the spoken language today.  According to the most stringent definition, there are about 5,000 chéngyǔ in the Chinese language, though some dictionaries list over 20,000. Chéngyǔ are considered the collected wisdom of the Chinese culture, and contain the experiences, moral concepts, and admonishments from previous generations of Chinese. Nowadays, chéngyǔ still play an important role in Chinese conversations and education. Chinese idioms are one of four types of formulaic expressions (熟语/熟語, shúyǔ), which also include collocations (惯用语/慣用語 guànyòngyǔ), two-part allegorical sayings (歇后语/歇後語 xiēhòuyǔ), and proverbs (谚语/諺語 yànyǔ).

They are often referred to as Chinese idioms or four-character idioms; however, they are not the only idioms in Chinese.

Origins, construction, and interpretation
Chéngyǔ are mostly derived from ancient literature, including the pre-Qin classics, poetry from all periods of Chinese history, and late imperial vernacular novels and short stories.  A small number were constructed in the 19th and early 20th centuries from Western source materials.  Among the early classical literature, the lyrical imagery from the Shijing, the Classic of Poetry, and the detailed and vivid stories recorded in the Zuozhuan and the Shiji serve as particularly rich source materials for chéngyǔ.  Since the Shijing poems consist of four-character lines, some chéngyǔ are direct quotes from the Shijing.  For example,  (wàn shòu wú jiāng, lit: "ten-thousand [year] lifespan without bound"), a traditional expression to wish someone a long life (often appearing on bowls and other tableware), quotes the poem "Tian Bao" (poem #166) in the Lesser Court Hymns section of the Shijing.  More commonly, however, chéngyǔ are created by succinctly paraphrasing or summarizing the original text, usually by selecting the most salient characters from the passage in question and inserting any necessary classical grammatical particles.

As such, chéngyǔ are fossilized expressions that use the vocabulary and follow the syntactic rules of Literary Chinese.  Consequently, they convey information more compactly than normal vernacular speech or writing.  They may contain subject and predicate and act as an independent clause (or even twin two-character independent clauses in parallel), or they may play the role of any part of speech in a sentence, acting syntactically as an adjective, adverb, verb, or noun phrase.  In both speech and writing, they serve to succinctly convey a complex or multifaceted situation, scene, or concept, and used fittingly and elegantly, they also mark a speaker or writer's erudition.

The meaning of a chéngyǔ usually surpasses the sum of the meanings carried by the four characters, as chéngyǔ are generally meant to convey the message or moral of the myth, story or historical event from which they were derived.  Thus, even after translation into modern words and syntax, chéngyǔ in isolation are often unintelligible without additional explanation.  Since they often contain a classical allusion, known as a diǎngù, elementary and secondary school students in greater China learn chéngyǔ as part of the classical curriculum in order to study the context from which the chéngyǔ was born.

Often the four characters reflect the moral behind the story rather than the story itself. For example, the phrase "" (lit: "break the pots and sink the ships") is based on a historical account where the general Xiang Yu ordered his troops to destroy all cooking utensils and boats after crossing a river into the enemy's territory.  He won the battle because of this "no-retreat" strategy.  Thus, the idiom is used as a verb phrase with the meaning "to make an all-out effort to achieve success by the deliberate removal of recourse or backup."  Similar phrases are known in the West, such as "Burning one's boats", "burning one's bridges", "Point of no return" or "Crossing the Rubicon".

Another example is "" (lit. "melon field, beneath the plums").  It is an idiom whose meaning relates to the appearance of misconduct or impropriety.  It is derived from an excerpt of a Han era poem (Yuèfǔ Shī "Jūnzǐ Xíng"). The poem includes the lines, "Don't adjust your shoes in a melon field and don't tidy your hat under the plum trees", admonishing the reader to avoid situations where, however innocent, he might be suspected of doing wrong. The literal meaning of the idiom is impossible to understand without the background knowledge of the origin of the phrase.

Some idioms have had their literal meanings overtake their original ones. For example, "wind from an empty cave" (kōng xué lái fēng), despite now being used to describe rumors without source, originally referred to rumors with actual, solid sources or reasons. Likewise, "bare-faced facing the emperor" (sù miàn cháo tiān) is now used to describe beauty that doesn't require make-up, e.g., when entering court, while its original meaning was "to be confident in one's true look".

However, not all chéngyǔ have stories to draw morals from. It is generally acknowledged as a chéngyǔ as it comes from the Analects, a Chinese classic. The idiom is succinct in its original meaning and would likely be intelligible to anyone learned in formal written Chinese, though yán is no longer commonly used as a verb.

There are a few chéngyǔ that are not four characters in length.  An example is the seven-character  (zuì wēng zhī yì bù zài jiǔ, lit:  "The Old Drunkard's attention is not directed towards his wine").  This is a direct quote from Ouyang Xiu's essay An Account of Old Drunkard's Pavilion (Zuiwengting Ji), in which the author ("Old Drunkard") expresses his true intention of enjoying the scenery of the mountains and rivers as he drinks.  As an idiom, it expresses the situation where one does something with an ulterior though benign motive in mind.

Some chéngyǔ have English equivalents. For example,  (yán bù yóu zhōng, lit: "speak not from the bosom") and "to speak with one's tongue in one's cheek" share idiomatic meanings.  The Chinese not having conducted maritime explorations of the North Atlantic during imperial times, the expression  (bīng shān yī jiǎo, lit: "one corner of an ice mountain") is a rare example of a chéngyǔ that emerged in the early 20th century after contact with the West as a translation of the expression "tip of the iceberg," thus sharing both their literal and idiomatic meanings.  Another expression  (huǒ zhōng qǔ lì, lit: "extracting chestnuts from the fire") originates from a La Fontaine fable means "to be duped into taking risks for someone else," used in much the same way as the expression "cat's paw" in English is another example of an "international" chéngyǔ.  Though they are recent in origin, they are constructed using the vocabulary and syntax of Literary Chinese and fits within the four-character scheme, making them chéngyǔ.

Chinese idioms can also serve as a guide through Chinese culture.  Chéngyǔ teach about motifs that were previously common in Chinese literature and culture. For example, idioms with nature motifs – e.g., mountains (山), water (水), and the moon (月)are numerous. Works considered masterpieces of Chinese literaturesuch as the Four Great Classical Novels – serve as the source for many idioms, which in turn condense and retell the story.

All Chinese people know idioms, though the total number known by any one individual will depend on their background. Idioms are such an important part of Chinese popular culture that there is a game called 
(chéngyǔ jiēlóng, lit: "connect the chengyu") that involves someone calling out an idiom, with someone else then being supposed to think of another idiom to link up with the first one, so that the last character of the first idiom is the same as the first character of the second idiom, and so forth.

Classification
 Subject-Predicate Idiom – e.g., 螳螂捕蟬
 Interrelated Idiom – e.g., 情投意合

Chinese examples
The following three examples show that the meaning of the idiom can be totally different by only changing one character.
     : "One day, a thousand autumns."
 Meaning: implies rapid changes; one day equals a thousand years
     : "One day, a thousand miles."
 Meaning: implies rapid progress; traveling a thousand miles in a day
     : "One day, three autumns."
 Meaning: greatly missing someone; one day feels as long as three years

 Four Gentlemen
 Four Treasures of the Study
 Three Friends of Winter
 Crouching Tiger, Hidden Dragon
 Seek truth from facts
 When two tigers fight
 Mirror Flower, Water Moon

Japanese examples

Yojijukugo is the similar format in Japanese. The term  is autological.  Many of these idioms were adopted from their Chinese counterparts and have the same or similar meaning as in Chinese.  The term  refers to an idiom that comes from a specific text as the source. As such, the overwhelming majority of koji seigo comes from accounts of history written in classical Chinese. Although a great many of the Japanese four-character idioms are derived from the Chinese, many others are purely Japanese in origin. Some examples:

  ka, chō, fū, getsu ("Flower, Bird, Wind, Moon"; beauties of nature)
  ichigo ichie (once-in-a-lifetime experience)
  okamehachimoku (a bystander's vantage point)
  temaemiso (singing one's own praises; tooting one's own horn)
  futamatagōyaku (double-dealer; time-server)
  fū, rin, ka, zan ("wind, woods, fire, mountain"; military proverb coming from Sun Tzu's "Art of War"; see also Fūrinkazan)

Korean examples

The Korean equivalent are Sajaseong-eo (Hanja: 四字成語). They have similar categorization to Japanese ones, such as Gosaseong-eo for historical idioms.

Vietnamese examples 
Four word idioms or any idiom in Vietnamese are known as thành ngữ (chữ Hán: 成語, literally "set phrase/speech"). A large amount of idioms originating from Classical Chinese have been borrowed into the language, but there exists native counterparts to the Classical Chinese idioms. There are also many idioms that are Vietnamese in origin. Vietnamese idioms can be classified into Sino-Vietnamese idioms (Vietnamese: thành ngữ Hán Việt, chữ Hán Nôm: 成語漢越) and native Vietnamese idioms (Vietnamese: thành ngữ thuần Việt, chữ Hán Nôm: 成語純越) that were once written in chữ Nôm, are now written in the Latin-based Vietnamese alphabet.

See also 
 Idiom
 Chinese characters
 Xiehouyu, typically longer Chinese proverbs
 Homophonic puns in Mandarin Chinese
 Proverbs commonly said to be Chinese
 Mulberry fields (idiom)

Dictionaries of Mandarin Chinese Idioms
(Harvard University)(Digitized Jul 22, 2005)
(Harvard University)(Digitized Mar 4, 2009)

References

External links 

 Theme Idioms - 相關成語／相关成语 at Thinking Chinese.
 Search for Chinese idioms at Chinese Notes

 
Japanese vocabulary